Makovec is a surname. Notable people with the surname include:

Jaroslav Makovec (born 1960), Czech race walker
Sara Makovec (born 2000), Slovenian footballer